The 2011–12 Texas A&M–Corpus Christi Islanders men's basketball team represented Texas A&M University–Corpus Christi in the 2011–12 college basketball season. This was head coach Willis Wilson's first season at Texas A&M–Corpus Christi. The Islanders are members of the West Division of the Southland Conference. They played their home games at the American Bank Center. They finished the season 6–24, 4–12 in Southland play to finish in last place in the West Division. They failed to qualify for the Southland Basketball tournament.

Media
Texas A&M–Corpus Christi men's basketball airs on KKTX with Steven King on the call all season long. Video streaming of all non-televised home games is available at GoIslanders.com.

Roster

Schedule and results

|-
!colspan=9 style=| Exhibition

|-
!colspan=9 style=| Regular season

References

Texas A&M–Corpus Christi Islanders men's basketball seasons
Texas AandM-Corpus Christi
Texas AandM-Corpus Christi Islanders basketball
Texas AandM-Corpus Christi Islanders basketball